Mehmet Akif Alakurt (born July 23, 1979) is a Turkish actor and model.

Career
He entered the world of fashion with Neşe Erberk agency as a model. In 1998 he took the "Most Promising" and "Turkey Prince" modelling titles.  In 2001, Akif won the title of The Best Model of Turkey, and the Best Model of the World, which he won again in 2002.

In 2002, he played in his first series, Kirik Ayna, as Ali Kirman, with Kadir Inanir, Burak Hakki and Yesim Buber.  In 2005 he played in the series Zeytin Dali as Kenan, with Bergüzar Korel. In 2006 he played in the series Haci as Ahmet Gesili, with Tuncel Kurtiz.

A turning point in Mehmet's career was when he starred as the main actor in the series Sila in 2006 as Boran Aga, the perfect husband of Cansu Dere's Sila. In 2008, he appeared in Adanali as Maraz Ali,  an intelligent, strong and good thief.  In 2011, Mehmet Akif played in another series, Ries, as Murat, a young man who comes back from the United States to find his family in a very bad financial situation and in debt, and is forced to work as a fisherman to support his family and pay the debts they owe.

Television

References

External links 
 
 Mehmet Akif Alakurt at the SinemaTürk
 Mehmet Akif Alakurt A Charismatic Star
http://www.haberler.com/mehmet-akif-alakurt/

1979 births
Living people
Turkish male television actors
Male actors from Istanbul
Turkish male models